Voskresenskoye is a rural locality (a selo) in Beketovskoye Rural Settlement, Vozhegodsky District, Vologda Oblast, Russia. The population was 8 as of 2002.

Geography 
Voskresenskoye is located 75 km southwest of Vozhega (the district's administrative centre) by road. Nikulskaya is the nearest rural locality.

References 

Rural localities in Vozhegodsky District